Richard Kristl (born November 14, 1995) is a Czech professional ice hockey player. He is currently playing for SK Horácká Slavia Třebíč of the Czech 1.liga.

Kristl made his Czech Extraliga debut playing with HC Plzeň during the 2015-16 Czech Extraliga season.

References

External links

1995 births
Living people
HC Plzeň players
SK Horácká Slavia Třebíč players
Czech ice hockey forwards